Phox may refer to: 
 PHOX, an American band
 PhoX, a proof assistant based on high order logic 
 PHOX2A, a protein
 PHOX2B, a protein
 Phosphinooxazolines, a class of chiral ligands commonly abbreviated as PHOX
 (S)-iPr-PHOX, a specific PHOX ligand